Sant Pere (Catalan for Saint Peter) may refer to:

Places

Catalonia
Sant Pere, Santa Caterina i la Ribera, neighbourhood of Barcelona
Sant Pere de les Puelles, monastery in Sant Pere, Santa Caterina i la Ribera
Sant Pere, Barcelona, neighbourhood within Sant Pere, Santa Caterina i la Ribera
Sant Pere de Besalú, monastery in Besalú
Sant Pere de Camprodon, monastery in Camprodon
Sant Pere de Galligants, monastery in Girona
Sant Pere de Graudescales, monastery in Navès
Sant Pere de les Maleses, church in La Pobla de Segur
Sant Pere Pescador, town in Alt Empordà
Sant Pere de la Portella, monastery in La Quar
Sant Pere de Riudebitlles, village in Alt Penedès
Sant Pere de Ribes, town in Garraf
Sant Pere de Rodes, monastery in El Port de la Selva
Sant Pere Sallavinera, village in Anoia
Sant Pere de Torelló, town in Osona
Sant Pere de Vilamajor, village in Vallès Oriental

Other
Sant Pere, Andorra
Colònia de Sant Pere, in Mallorca
Sant Pere d'Albaida, or Sempere, in Valencia province
Serra de Sant Pere, mountain range in the Valencian Community